Paul Quinn ( – 20 October 2007) was a young man from County Armagh, Northern Ireland, who was murdered in 2007. His family subsequently accused the Provisional Irish Republican Army (IRA) of his murder, though no one has ever been convicted in relation to his death.

Attack, torture and murder in Tullycoora
On 20 October 2007, Paul Quinn (21), a native of Cullyhanna, County Armagh, was lured to a farm at Tullycoora, near Oram in County Monaghan, where three of his friends were held hostage. When he arrived at the farm, a group of some ten or more men beat him with iron and nail-studded bars for upwards of half an hour, breaking every major bone in his body. He was taken at around 18:00 to Our Lady of Lourdes Hospital, Drogheda, where he died two hours later.

Accusations of Quinn family
Quinn's parents, Breege and Stephen, have said that members of the Provisional Irish Republican Army's South Armagh Brigade were responsible. Their son had had "run-ins with the Cullyhanna ASU on a number of occasions", and had "floored" the son of one of the active service unit (ASU) leaders in a pub row. Following the incident, the mother of the young man appeared at Quinn's family home with a hammer in her hand and told the family their son would have to leave Ireland. Quinn's murder is believed to have arisen as a result of a dispute between Quinn and the local IRA.

IMC report
In November 2007, the Independent Monitoring Commission's John Grieve, stated that, "We do believe that those involved ... included people who are members or former members, or have associations with members or former members, of the Provisional IRA." However, the report also found that there was no evidence that the organisation's leadership orchestrated or had any knowledge of the killing.

Further reports
An Irish Independent report of September 2007 stated: 

In October 2011, his parents were featured in an RTÉ news report, stating they still believe people living locally "know all about" the murder and have called on them to go to the Garda Síochána or the Police Service of Northern Ireland (PSNI) to "get it off their chest".

In a statement made October 2021 following ongoing inquiries in South Armagh, a Garda spokesperson said that officers were still working with PSNI officers in a bid to solve the murder.  Describing the investigation and solving the murder as “utmost priority”, Gardaí made a public appeal urging those with information to come forward, “no matter how small or insignificant” it might seem.

Reactions
Seán Cardinal Brady, Archbishop of Armagh, spoke out against the murder and appealed for the arrest of those involved.

In November 2007, the Ulster Unionist Party peer, Lord Laird of Artigarvan, invoked parliamentary privilege in the House of Lords to name the alleged killers, stating that the killing arose from a dispute between Quinn and the son of a man who he described as "a local IRA chief". He also raised at Westminster allegations by the Quinn family and other locals that one of the men used as 'bait' in the Quinn death is under threat from the South Armagh Provisionals.

Both Gerry Adams and Martin McGuinness condemned the murder.

Controversial comments
In November 2007 Bertie Ahern remarked in the Dáil that based on reports from the Gárdaí and PSNI that "this action was due to criminality". The following month Ahern backtracked, saying he "did not in any way intend to make an issue out of the character of Paul Quinn and I am happy to make that clear to the House". He added that the only criminals involved were those who had killed Paul Quinn.

Shortly after Paul Quinns death, Conor Murphy said in an interview with Spotlight that "Paul Quinn was involved with smuggling and criminality and I think that everyone accepts that."

During the 2020 Irish general election Conor Murphys' comments were an issue.

Mary Lou McDonald said on 3 February 2020 that she would ask Conor Murphy to talk to Pauls' mother Breege. She also said that she did not believe that it had been said that Paul Quinn was a criminal, but that the best thing was for Conor Murphy to speak to Paul’s mother. Breege Quinn said that her son was definitely not involved in criminality and called on Conor Murphy to withdraw his remarks and make a public apology to the Quinn family. On 6 February 2020 Conor Murphy spoke to RTÉ and said that he had withdrawn the remarks he had made in 2007 and apologised to the Quinn family. Breege Quinn repeated her call for him to resign as Minister for Finance at Stormont. She said he "should finish off and get justice" for the Quinn family. She said he should "go and tell the PSNI and the Gardaí exactly who he was speaking to" in the IRA after the murder. She said she would not meet Conor Murphy until he "comes out publicly saying that he is going to the PSNI to give the names of the IRA that he spoke to in Cullyhanna". Mary Lou McDonald said that she had made an honest mistake when she said that she did not believe that Mr Murphy had said that Mr Quinn was involved in criminality. She had only realised her mistake when she saw the BBC Spotlight programme on which the comments were made.

Breege Quinn denied that her family had suddenly started asking questions because of the election but she has been fighting for the past 13 years for justice.

The general election was on 8 February 2020.

On 17 February 2020 the Quinn family visited Stormont, accompanied by members of the SDLP.

Discovery of body of Gerard Evans
The murder of Paul Quinn led indirectly to the discovery of the body of another victim of the Provisional IRA, Gerard Evans, a 24 year old from Crossmaglen, who had gone missing after being kidnapped by the organisation in 1979. In 2009, the Sunday Tribune newspaper received information from an ex-IRA member about the location of Evans' body, who stated that he had been influenced in coming forward by the circumstances of Paul Quinn's death. The information provided led to the location of Evans' body in 2010.

See also
List of unsolved murders
Murder of Andrew Burns
Murder of Robert McCartney
Murder of Gareth O'Connor
Murder of Joseph Rafferty

References

External links

2007 deaths
2007 in Ireland
2007 murders in the Republic of Ireland
Date of birth missing
Male murder victims
October 2007 events in Europe
Murder victims from Northern Ireland
People from County Armagh
People killed by the Provisional Irish Republican Army
People murdered by Irish organized crime
People murdered in the Republic of Ireland
Unsolved murders in Ireland